Mazyad may refer to:

eponymous ancestor of the Banu Mazyad, dynasty that ruled Hilla in the 10th–11th centuries
ancestor of the Yazidids, dynasty that ruled Shirvan in the 9th–14th centuries
Mazyad Freeh (born 1989), Saudia Arabian footballer
Mohammed Mazyad (born 1991), Saudia Arabian footballer